Coryphopteris is a genus of ferns in the family Thelypteridaceae, subfamily Thelypteridoideae, in the Pteridophyte Phylogeny Group classification of 2016 (PPG I).

Species
, the Checklist of Ferns and Lycophytes of the World accepted the following species:

Coryphopteris andersonii Holttum
Coryphopteris andreae Holttum
Coryphopteris angulariloba (Ching) L.J.He & X.C.Zhang
Coryphopteris arthrotricha Holttum
Coryphopteris athyriocarpa (Copel.) Holttum
Coryphopteris athyrioides Holttum
Coryphopteris atjehensis Holttum
Coryphopteris badia (Alderw.) Holttum
Coryphopteris borealis Holttum
Coryphopteris brevipilosa Holttum
Coryphopteris coriacea (Brause) Holttum
Coryphopteris diaphana (Brause) Holttum
Coryphopteris diversisora (Copel.) Holttum
Coryphopteris dura (Copel.) Holttum
Coryphopteris engleriana (Brause) Holttum
Coryphopteris fasciculata (E.Fourn.) Holttum
Coryphopteris gymnopoda (Baker) Holttum
Coryphopteris hirsutipes (C.B.Clarke) Holttum
Coryphopteris holttumii Parris
Coryphopteris horizontalis (Rosenst.) Holttum
Coryphopteris hubrechtensis Holttum
Coryphopteris inopinata Holttum
Coryphopteris iwatsukii Holttum
Coryphopteris japonica (Baker) L.J.He & X.C.Zhang
Coryphopteris klossii (Ridl.) Holttum
Coryphopteris kolombangarae Holttum
Coryphopteris lauterbachii (Brause) Holttum
Coryphopteris ledermannii (Hieron.) Holttum
Coryphopteris marquesensis (Lorence & K.R.Wood) comb. ined.
Coryphopteris meiobasis Holttum
Coryphopteris microlepigera Holttum
Coryphopteris multisora (C.Chr.) Holttum
Coryphopteris obtusata (Alderw.) Holttum
Coryphopteris oligolepia (Alderw.) Holttum
Coryphopteris pectiniformis (C.Chr.) Holttum
Coryphopteris petelotii (Ching) Holttum
Coryphopteris platyptera (Copel.) Holttum
Coryphopteris plumosa (C.Chr.) Holttum
Coryphopteris propria (Alderw.) Holttum
Coryphopteris pubirachis (Baker) Holttum
Coryphopteris quaylei (E.D.Br.) Holttum
Coryphopteris raiateana Holttum
Coryphopteris seemannii Holttum
Coryphopteris seramensis M.Kato
Coryphopteris simulata (Davenp.) S.E.Fawc.
Coryphopteris squamipes (Copel.) Holttum
Coryphopteris stereophylla (Alderw.) Holttum
Coryphopteris subbipinnata Holttum
Coryphopteris subnigra (Brause) Holttum
Coryphopteris sulawesica Holttum
Coryphopteris tahanensis Holttum
Coryphopteris tanggamensis Holttum
Coryphopteris unidentata (Bedd.) Holttum
Coryphopteris viscosa (Baker) Holttum
Coryphopteris vitiensis Holttum

References

Thelypteridaceae
Fern genera